The Newlywed Game is an American television game show that puts newly married couples against each other in a series of revealing question rounds to determine how well the spouses know or do not know each other. The program, originally created by Robert "Nick" Nicholson and E. Roger Muir (credited on-screen as Roger E. Muir) and produced by Chuck Barris, has appeared in many different versions since its 1966 debut. The show became famous for some of the arguments that couples had over incorrect answers in the form of mistaken predictions, and it even led to some divorces.

Many of The Newlywed Games questions dealt with "making whoopee", the euphemism that producers used for sexual intercourse to circumvent network censorship. However, it became such a catchphrase of the show that its original host, Bob Eubanks, continued to use the phrase throughout the show's many runs, even in the 1980s and 1990s episodes and beyond, when he could easily have said "make love" or "have sex" during these periods without censorship.

Game Show Network's version of The Newlywed Game airs reruns throughout the week. Network Bounce TV has acquired the reruns from GSN.

In 2013, TV Guide ranked it No. 10 in its list of the 60 greatest game shows ever.

Broadcast history
The Newlywed Game debuted on the ABC television network on July 11, 1966, scheduled at 2 p.m. (1 p.m. Central).  On the day it debuted, CBS preempted its popular Password to cover a news conference held by then-Defense Secretary Robert McNamara, which was delayed a half-hour, with the network "vamping" until he spoke. ABC opted to wait until just as the press conference began, and as a result The Newlywed Game was able to get a slight head start in the head-to-head ratings battle with the long-running Password. Over the next few months more and more viewers were tuning into The Newlywed Game and it became a hit, while Password's ratings began to fall and eventually led to the series' cancellation fourteen months later.

However, NBC debuted Days of Our Lives in late 1965 at 2/1, a soap opera that initially struggled to climb in the ratings. But by the early 1970s, Days of Our Lives was winning the timeslot regularly (though not always) over The Newlywed Game and CBS' Guiding Light. Eventually, ABC determined that The Newlywed Game had run its course on daytime and on December 20, 1974, the show concluded its initial run after nearly eight and a half years on the network. It was the longest-running game show in ABC daytime history until 1985, when Family Feud surpassed it, having run nine years at the time of its cancellation that year. The Money Maze, a game hosted by Cincinnati TV personality Nick Clooney, father of famed actor George Clooney, replaced it on the ABC schedule, but lasted only six months.

A syndicated version of the show began airing in 1977, with the same rules and set as the ABC original, albeit with more double entendres than the original. Mostly successful, it nonetheless was canceled in 1980, not directly because of the show itself. In fall 1979, creator Chuck Barris had debuted something of a spin-off show, 3's a Crowd, in which a man, his wife and his secretary would compete. The controversy, driven by the implications of adultery that came with such a concept, ruined Barris's reputation and not only ended 3's a Crowd, but all three of Barris's other shows that were airing at the time: The Newlywed Game, The Dating Game and The Gong Show. This was because most local stations did not want anything to do with the controversy, fearing potential boycotts and loss of advertising that might result.

A special week-long series for Valentine's Day aired on ABC in February 1984 and was the last time the show aired on a broadcast network. The set for the week of specials would later be used for Bob Eubanks' return to The New Newlywed Game in syndication a year later.

Up until the GSN series' premiere on October 12, 2009, all subsequent editions of The Newlywed Game were seen in syndication. A revival that aired from 1985 until 1989 was referred to as The New Newlywed Game for the first three and a half years of its run. The last and most recent syndicated Newlywed Game aired new episodes from 1996 until 1999, continued in reruns for an additional season, and was sold to stations as part of an hour-long block with a revival of The Dating Game.

Production

Hosts and announcers
Founding host Bob Eubanks was the master of ceremonies, or "emcee", who became most often associated with The Newlywed Game. Just 28 years old at the time the show debuted in 1966, he was the youngest emcee to host a game show. Eubanks hosted the ABC and first syndicated series, then returned to host The New Newlywed Game in September 1985. Former Dating Game host Jim Lange hosted the aforementioned week of specials in 1984, as Eubanks was hosting Dream House on NBC at the time, making Lange the only person to host both The Dating Game and The Newlywed Game.

In December 1988, Eubanks stepped down as the host of the series and he was replaced with comedian Paul Rodriguez. The title of the series became The Newlywed Game Starring Paul Rodriguez and remained so for the remainder of the 1988–89 season, after which the series was cancelled after four seasons.

Gary Kroeger hosted the first season of the revival of The Newlywed Game in 1996, which was conducted under a much different format from the previous series. After a year of struggling ratings, Eubanks returned to host and the format was reinstated to the classic Newlywed Game format. He has also hosted several special episodes of the current Newlywed Game, which has made Eubanks the only host to preside over an episode of the same series in six different decades.

The GSN edition was hosted by Carnie Wilson and narrated by Randy West from its debut on April 6, 2009 until the end of its third season on July 16, 2010, when Wilson elected not to return. As noted above, Eubanks hosted two special episodes of this version – one featured Wilson and her husband as well as her sister Wendy, her mother Marilyn, and their husbands; the second featured game show hosts Monty Hall, Peter Marshall, Wink Martindale and their wives. On August 18, 2010, it was announced that The View co-host Sherri Shepherd would take over as host for the fourth season of the show which premiered November 1, 2010. The fifth season premiered on April 18, 2011, with a new logo design, and with Shepherd serving as a narrator in addition to hosting. Shepherd continued taking on the role of host and narrator for the sixth season which premiered on October 25, 2012.

Scott Beach, who was Barris's first choice as host, was the announcer in the very early episodes of The Newlywed Game. After Beach resigned, Barris's primary staff announcer, Johnny Jacobs, took over, continuing as the announcer for the series until the first syndicated version was canceled in 1980. Tony McClay, who was a frequent Jacobs substitute, took over from time to time on the syndicated Newlywed Game. Rod Roddy was the announcer for the ABC specials. When The New Newlywed Game premiered in 1985, Bob Hilton was its announcer. He was replaced by Charlie O'Donnell, who Barris had signed away from Barry & Enright Productions, in early 1988. O'Donnell continued to announce through the end of the Paul Rodriguez-hosted season, then left Barris to return to his position at Wheel of Fortune, which he held till his death.

Los Angeles radio DJ Ellen K provided the announcing for the first season of the 1996 revival, with John Cramer taking over upon Eubanks's return. For the first season of the 2009 revival Brad Aldous served as the announcer. Randy West took over for the next two seasons, and former host Gary Kroeger took over for West for the fourth season. As of the fifth season, host Shepherd doubled as announcer for the couple introductions and the voice-overs for the prize descriptions.

Theme songs
The theme music originally started off as a vocal song called "Summertime Guy".  The song was written by Chuck Barris for singer Eddie Rambeau, who performed and released the song on a Swan label 45 rpm SP record. Minutes before the song was to be presented on American Bandstand in 1962, ABC informed Rambeau that he couldn't sing the song (because Chuck Barris was an ABC employee at the time), and he performed the B-side of the record instead.

Not wanting the song to go to waste, Barris commissioned Milton DeLugg a few years later to arrange an instrumental version of "Summertime Guy" for use as the first theme to The Newlywed Game. The theme music was performed by the Trumpets Olé in a style similar to Herb Alpert and the Tijuana Brass, and was released as the last track on the LP album "The Trumpets Olé Play Instrumentals". To better fit the show's spirit, DeLugg preceded the pop song's melody with a sample of Mendelssohn's Wedding March.

The theme was re-recorded around 1973 by Frank Jaffe and Michael Stewart. Featured as the third track on the LP album Chuck Barris Presents Themes from TV Game Shows, it was used on The Newlywed Game beginning with the syndicated version in 1977. Then, Milton DeLugg, who was by this time Barris' house musical director, created a new, updated theme based on the existing melody for The New Newlywed Game beginning with Jim Lange's 1984 series of specials, and then for the first several years of the Bob Eubanks-hosted revival.

When Paul Rodriguez took over in 1988, the theme song was changed to the 1950s doo wop classic "Book of Love" by the Monotones, making this the only theme song of the show with lyrics. The Gary Kroeger version featured an entirely new theme; when Eubanks returned, a new recording of the classic theme was used for his first season (arranged by Steve Kaplan & Jim Latham), but dropped in favor of a new theme for the third season by Barry Coffing and John Blaylock.

The GSN version uses an updated looping version of the classic theme composed by Lewis Flinn. For Shepherd's second season, the show's logo, intro, and set was changed, dropping the classic theme.

Production companies
Chuck Barris Productions produced all versions from 1966 to 1986, with the 1986–89 versions credited to Barris Productions. Columbia TriStar Television (CTT), who owns the Chuck Barris game show library, produced and distributed the 1996–1999 revivals. Embassy Row, a New York-based television production company, produces the Wilson and Shepherd-hosted version for CTT's successor Sony Pictures Television (who owns the formatting rights and, as of January 14, 2009, Embassy Row) and GSN.

Gameplay
For the first round, the wives were taken off the stage while the husbands were asked how they thought their wives would answer three questions. The wives were then brought back on stage and were asked for their answers for the same three questions. Once the wife gave her answer, the husband revealed the answer that he previously gave, which was written on a blue card. A match for that question was worth 5 points for the couple.

The roles were reversed in the second round, where the husbands were taken off the stage and the wives were asked four questions before the husbands were brought back on stage to give their answers. The first three questions in this round were worth 10 points each, and the final question was worth 25 points; Eubanks referred to this as the "25-point bonus question". The maximum possible score for any couple was 70 points. The couple with the highest score at the end of the second round won a prize that was "chosen just for you". (Actually, the couples had requested a certain prize and competed with other couples that had requested the same prize.) By 1987, this practice was eliminated.

The grand prize was never a car or cash, but it could include just about anything else: appliances, furniture, home entertainment systems, a trailer or motorcycles, trips (complete with luggage and camera), etc. In the 1997 remake, the grand prize was always a trip, this time referred to as "a fabulous second honeymoon" instead of "a grand prize chosen just for you."

Prior to taping the show, each couple was asked to predict the total points they would earn. In the event of a tie for first place, the tied couples reveal a card showing this predicted score. The winner went to whichever couple that had the closest guess without going over their actual total; otherwise, it went to the couple who had the closest guess, provided that all tied couples went over. An exact guess awarded a bonus prize to the winners.

For the first half of the 1988–89 season, the series adopted a new scoring format where each correct answer paid cash. In the first half, four questions were played at $25 per right answer. The second half featured three questions and the first two paid off at $50 for a right answer. The third question saw the couples wager any or all of their money, with right answers adding the amount of the wager and wrong answers deducting it. The couple in the lead at the end of the game still won the grand prize, but any money that the other three couples won was theirs to keep.  The maximum possible amount was $500.

This scoring format was dropped, and the old one reinstated, when Paul Rodriguez took over as host in December 1988, although the number of couples competing was then reduced to three.

1996–97 version
When Gary Kroeger took over in Fall 1996 the show was overhauled with a new format. Like with the 1988–89 season of The New Newlywed Game, three couples competed in a series of rounds.

Round 1
Each spouse was shown a videotape of their mates who gave a statement mostly about their spouse. The tape was paused near the end which gave the spouse in control a chance predict how his/her mate completed the statement. Then the tape played again, and a correct answer earned 10 points. First the husbands' tapes were shown and the wives took a guess, and then it went the opposite direction.

An alternate format had the wives asked a series of questions prior to the show. The wives buzzed in when they believe their husband could match and said, "He better know this." Matches earn 5 points and not matching cost 5 points.

Round 2
Kroeger asked the couples a multiple-choice question in which one half of the couples had given answers in advance, and the other must guess what they chose. Each match again earns 10 points. First the wives predicted what their husbands said, then the process was reversed.

Round 3
In this round before the show, either the wives or the husbands gave some very weird facts about themselves. Kroeger gave the facts to the other half of the couple, who were equipped with heart-shaped signs that say "That's My Wife/Man!" If they recognized that fact, all they had to do was to raise the sign and yell out "THAT'S MY WIFE/MAN!" Correct recognitions won 10 points for their team, but wrong ones lost 10 points for the team. Only the first person to raise the sign could win or lose. Seven facts were played.

Round 4
In this final round of the game, Kroeger read a series of choices (ex: Candy or Potato Chips, Rocket Scientist or Space Cadet, Ketchup or Mustard, etc.) and the wives held cards with one of the choices on it. Then the husbands chose one of the two things that most applies to them. Each match earned points. There were seven questions, and each question was worth 10 points more than the previous question with the last question worth even more. So 310 points were possible for any couple who answer all seven questions correctly in this round.

Question 1 – 10 points
Question 2 – 20 points
Question 3 – 30 points
Question 4 – 40 points
Question 5 – 50 points
Question 6 – 60 points
Question 7 – 100 points

The couple with the most points would win the game and the second honeymoon trip. If there was a tie, a tie-breaker question was played until only one couple correctly answered the question; that couple would then win. If two couples answered correctly or incorrectly, this tie-breaker was repeated with a new question. This also applied to all three couples who answered right or wrong, or two of the three couples in the tie-breaker who answered correctly.

This format was mostly disliked by fans of the original show, so for the second season of this version, it reverted to its original format and theme, with original host Eubanks back at the helm.

2009–2013 version
The first season of the GSN version retained the classic format, but again only used three couples and the addition of a new endgame featuring a couple from a previous version, referred to as "Goldyweds".

In Round 1, three questions were asked of the wives, and the husbands try to match the wives' responses for 5 points apiece. The roles were reversed for Round 2, with the first two questions worth 10 points. The third and final question, worth 20 points, was called the "eHarmony.com Dimension Question" and was based on one of the "29 dimensions" used by the site to match up couples. (In some episodes which had couples who had first met on eHarmony.com, no mention of eHarmony or a specific "dimension" was mentioned for this last question.) The maximum possible score for any couple for the first season was 55 points. The couple with the highest score won a second honeymoon vacation.

The winners then played a Bonus Round against the Goldyweds, who were a couple that had appeared on a previous version of the show; usually, this was one of the versions Eubanks had hosted. In this round, the wives were taken off-stage and asked 5 questions during the commercial break. The husbands took positions in the front of the stage as their wives sit on chairs in the back. The questions were worth increasing values from 1–5 points (for a maximum possible score of 15 points for either couple). The couple with the most points won a bonus prize, usually a piece of Sony technology.

In the show's second season, several changes were made in the gameplay. The game was still played with only three couples, but the husbands were first to give responses to three questions for the wives to guess at 5 points each. (Some episodes featured "Maybelline Beauty Questions", quizzing the husbands on their wives's beauty routines; or "Ladies' Home Journal 'Can This Marriage Be Saved?' Questions", which focused on some of the tougher aspects of married life as based on the magazine's trademark column.) Then the wives responded to four questions; the first three worth 10 points each (on occasion, the third was still a "eHarmony.com Dimension Question"), and the fourth being a two-response bonus question, with each part worth 15 points (couples received 15 points for getting one of the two responses right, or 30 points for both), making for a maximum score of 75 points per couple. As before, the highest-scoring couple won a second honeymoon trip, but no Goldywed Bonus Round was played. (The "Goldywed" concept lived on, however, in the form of occasional special shows featuring couples that appeared on one of the earlier versions.) In the sixth season, the fourth question returns to its original 25 point bonus question.

In the event of a tie during either the main game (in either season) or the endgame (in the first season), standard Newlywed Game "prediction" tiebreaker rules apply.

Same-sex couples
In the 2009–10 season, The Newlywed Game had the first same-sex married couples appear on the show. In episode two of the season, the first such couple was Star Trek actor George Takei and his husband, Brad Altman, playing in a special Celebrity Edition of the game, against The Biggest Loser couple Damien Gurganius and Nicole Brewer, and Christopher Knight and Adrienne Curry (My Fair Brady). Takei and Altman won the game and $10,000 for their charity,  the Japanese American National Museum. The first non-celebrity same-sex couple, also winning their episode's grand prize package, would appear the following season (2010–11), which coincided with the third season's premiere episode, which aired on June 17, 2010.

Specials

The Newlywed Game: A Silver Anniversary of Love and Laughter
On April 18, 1998; a special titled The Newlywed Game: A Silver Anniversary of Love and Laughter aired on Game Show Network (GSN) hosted by Bob Eubanks and was announced by Gene Wood (though Wood was never credited) where it looks back at some of the couples who have appeared on the show during the 60's, 70's & 80's incarnations.

Cover Story: The Newlywed Game - Most Outrageous Answers
On October 28, 2018; an episode of the series Cover Story airing on Game Show Network (GSN) titled Cover Story: The Newlywed Game - Most Outrageous Answers hosted by Trish Suhr, features the most outrageous and hilarious moments from the show that spans over many seasons.

Episode status
Most episodes of the original ABC daytime version are lost, and many of those that do survive are said to have deteriorated. However, a handful have been shown on GSN, most notably the 1974 finale. The ABC nighttime version's status is also unknown for similar reasons, although a few of the evening shows have been shown on GSN's former block "Game Show Saturday Night". Most of the syndicated version exists, and has been rerun on GSN in the past.

In 2009, GSN premiered a new version of The Newlywed Game. The first three seasons were hosted by Carnie Wilson, and since November 1, 2010 have been hosted by Sherri Shepherd. With these two hosts and a combined six seasons, this version has had 430 episodes, 260 with Shepherd and 170 with Wilson.

On March 21, 2012, GSN announced that a sixth season of The Newlywed Game with Sherri Shepherd would air in the 2012–13 television season. The sixth season of The Newlywed Game premiered on GSN on October 25, 2012 at 8pm, airing four new episodes every Thursday night.

In October 2021, it was announced that classic episodes hosted by Eubanks would air on Buzzr beginning on November 15, making the series the first Sony-owned property to air on the network. As of February 2022, the network has aired episodes from the 1997-98 season.

Licensed merchandise
Hasbro produced three home editions of The Newlywed Game during its 1960s/70s run on ABC from 1967 and 1969. Prior to this, a special rarely seen red box edition was released in 1979 similar to the Hasbro editions, It even uses the same questions as well. However, the copyright is from "A Chuck Barris Production" instead of Hasbro. Pressman released a version based on the 1985 version in 1986. Currently, classic board games creator Endless Games, which specializes in board games based on several widely popular, long-running television game shows, including The Price is Right and Million Dollar Password, distributes home versions of The Newlywed Game, including three standard editions (the third titled "Classic" to differentiate itself from the current GSN version), a DVD edition, a "Quick Picks" travel-size edition, and a "Deluxe Edition" which combines the first standard edition game with the DVD edition.

In 1971, Pocket Books published a beginners' cookbook entitled The Newlywed Game Cook Book. It was compiled by Jody Cameron Malis and featured Bob Eubanks' picture on the cover.

A video slot machine based on The Newlywed Game was released by IGT in 2004. It had an animated Jim Lange (who had previously hosted the ABC special in 1984) appearing in the game instead of Bob Eubanks.

The show's original theme music has been released several times on LP and CD, most notably as part of the GSN-approved Classic TV Game Show Themes CD from Varèse Sarabande.

International versions

See also
 Here Come the Newlyweds
 Mr and Mrs
 I'm Telling!

References

External links
 Kroeger era (US)
 Eubanks era (US)
 GSN (US)
 

1966 American television series debuts
1974 American television series endings
1977 American television series debuts
1980 American television series endings
1984 American television series debuts
1989 American television series endings
1996 American television series debuts
1999 American television series endings
2009 American television series debuts
2013 American television series endings
1960s American game shows
1970s American game shows
1980s American game shows
1990s American game shows
2000s American game shows
2010s American game shows
American Broadcasting Company original programming
Nine Network original programming
Network 10 original programming
ITV game shows
First-run syndicated television programs in the United States
Game Show Network original programming
Television series by CBS Studios
Television series by Sony Pictures Television
Television series by Barris Industries
Television series by Embassy Row (production company)
English-language television shows
American television series revived after cancellation
Television shows set in Los Angeles
1966 Australian television series debuts
1972 Australian television series endings
1986 British television series debuts
1987 British television series endings
1960s Australian game shows
1970s Australian game shows
1980s Australian game shows
1980s British game shows